Regina Kleine-Kuhlmann (born 19 February 1959) is a German former rower. She competed in the women's quadruple sculls event at the 1984 Summer Olympics.

References

External links
 

1959 births
Living people
German female rowers
Olympic rowers of West Germany
Rowers at the 1984 Summer Olympics
People from Bramsche
Sportspeople from Lower Saxony